Promised Messiah Day (Urdu: مسیح موعود کا دن, Masih Maw'oud Ka Den) is commemorated by members of the Ahmadiyya Muslims annually on March 23 which marked the day when Mirza Ghulam Ahmad whom the Ahmadis consider as the Promised Messiah took oath of allegiance from forty members in Ludhiana, Punjab and initiated the movement.

Origin 
On March 23, 1889, Mirza Ghulam Ahmad founded the Ahmadiyya branch of Islam.

References

 

Ahmadiyya events
March observances
Islamic terminology